Major-General Sir Denis Pack  (7 October 1775–24 July 1823) was an Anglo-Irish military officer during the Napoleonic Wars.

Background

A descendant of Sir Christopher Packe, Pack was the son of the Very Reverend Thomas Pack, Dean of Ossory in the east of Ireland. His mother was Catherine, daughter and heiress of Denis Sullivan of Berehaven, Ireland.
His tomb is in St. Canice's Cathedral in Kilkenny, Ireland near Kilkenny Castle.

Military career

He saw service in Flanders in 1794, was on the Quiberon expedition of 1795, and in Ireland of the suppression of the 1798 rebellion.

He commanded the 71st Foot during the capture of the Cape of Good Hope in 1806.

His regiment was incorporated to the forces of General William Beresford when he led the first British invasion to Buenos Aires in June of that year. Their regiment contributed more than half of the invading troops, and with them Beresford occupied Buenos Aires without greater resistance.

However, in the second week of August 1806, Santiago de Liniers would begin one of the most important events of Argentine History, reconquering the city and overcoming the English. Its officers and troops were taken prisoners and interned in different localities of the Viceroyalty of the Rio de la Plata.

General Beresford, together with Colonel Pack, were housed in the Villa of Luján. Both soldiers fled later to Montevideo, aided by local independentists. Once in Montevideo, Pack joined the division of General Robert Craufurd to join the second invasion to Buenos Aires, although he had taken the oath never again to take up arms against Spain.

Pack violated his oath, taking active part in the occupation of Colonia del Sacramento, which made the attack by Colonel Francisco Javier de Elío fail.

He accompanied Craufurd in the battle of Corrales de Miserere and in the attack on the city of Buenos Aires. He occupied with the men at his command the Church of Santo Domingo, where the local resistance forced him to rest; there he found the flag of his beloved 71st Regiment but, despite his efforts, he was overcome by the tenacity of the attack by the Buenos Aires regiments. He tried to abandon his position and the city, but the Buenos Aires forces gathered around him, and he was forced to surrender once again.

The people were looking for Pack to execute him for perjury, but the Dominican friars protected him until he was delivered to General John Whitelocke, at the beginning of the English retreat.

In 1806, he was in the Peninsular War in 1808, and the Walcheren expedition in 1809.

During the Peninsular War he was present at the battles of Roliça, Vimiero, A Coruña, Bussaco, Ciudad Rodrigo, Salamanca, Vitoria, the Pyrenees, Nivelle, Nive, Orthez and Toulouse.  His Peninsular Gold Medal had seven clasps.

Pack was promoted to major-general in 1813 and commanded (1810–14) the Oporto Brigade of the Portuguese Army in Spain. He was made a Knight Commander of the Order of the Bath in 1815 and commanded the 9th Brigade of Sir Thomas Picton's 5th Division at the Battle of Waterloo. He became Lieutenant-Governor of Plymouth and General Officer Commanding Western District in 1819.

His widow Elizabeth Louisa Pack married his friend and fellow officer Lt Gen Thomas Reynell.

Notes

References

Further reading
 – a far more detailed biography

|-

1823 deaths
Recipients of the Waterloo Medal
Recipients of the Army Gold Cross
1770s births
People educated at Kilkenny College
British Army personnel of the Napoleonic Wars
British Army personnel of the Peninsular War
British prisoners of war (Napoleonic Wars)
Irish knights
Knights Commander of the Order of the Bath